United We Stand may refer to:

 "United we stand, divided we fall", a motto
 United We Stand America, a U.S. political movement, 1992–95
 United We Stand (film), a 1986 Hong Kong film directed by Kent Cheng
 United We Stand (Documentary), a 2003 documentary directed by Matteo Barzini
 United We Stand (novel), a novel by Eric Walters
 Divided We Fall, United We Stand, an event in the Marvel Comics series Ultimate Comics: The Ultimates
 Impact Wrestling United We Stand, a 2019 professional wrestling event

Music
 United We Stand (Brotherhood of Man album), 1970
 "United We Stand" (song), the title song
 United We Stand (Debby and Glen Campbell album)
 United We Stand (Hillsong United album)
 United We Stand (Brad album)
 United We Stand: What More Can I Give, a 2001 benefit concert

See also

 
 
 Divided We Fall (disambiguation)
 United We Fall (disambiguation)
 Divided We Stand (disambiguation)